British-born American actress Frances Fisher started her acting career in theater after moving to New York. She had a successful 14-year stage career in regional and off-Broadway productions before she was cast as Deborah Saxon in the television mystery crime drama series and soap opera The Edge of Night (1976–1981). She has appeared in numerous television series, including minor reoccurring roles on Guiding Light (1985), Becker (1999), Titus (2002), The Lyon's Den (2003), The Shield (2008), Eureka (2008), Touch (2013), Masters of Sex (2015–2016), and Watchmen (2019). She also had main roles in Strange Luck with D. B. Sweeney  (1995), Glory Days with Eddie Cahill (2002), and Resurrection with Kurtwood Smith (2014–2015).

Fisher began acting in films in 1983 with a small role in Can She Bake a Cherry Pie? before going on to appearing in the films Pink Cadillac with Clint Eastwood (1989), Striptease with Demi Moore (1996), and Wild America with Jamey Sheridan (1997). In 1997, she was cast as Ruth DeWitt Bukater in the epic romance and disaster film Titanic, opposite Kate Winslet. The film itself earned significant critical and commercial success, and the role earned Fisher international recognition. She starred in the 2008 drama film Jolene opposite Jessica Chastain and had minor roles in The Lincoln Lawyer (2011), Laws of Attraction (2004), The Host (2013), You're Not You (2014), and Holidate (2020). 

Fisher has also appeared in numerous television films including playing Lucille Ball in Lucy & Desi: Before the Laughter (1991), and Janet Lee Bouvier Auchincloss in Jackie Bouvier Kennedy Onassis (2000).

Film

Television films

Television

References

External links
 

Actress filmographies
American filmographies